András Komm (born 8 January 1974) is a Hungarian sailor. He competed in the Star event at the 1996 Summer Olympics.

References

External links
 

1974 births
Living people
Hungarian male sailors (sport)
Olympic sailors of Hungary
Sailors at the 1996 Summer Olympics – Star
Sportspeople from Budapest